The 2018 U Sports Men's University Cup Hockey Tournament (56th Annual) was held March 15–18, 2018 in Fredericton, New Brunswick and played at the Aitken Centre on UNB's Fredericton campus. This event marked the second year of a successful two-year bid to host the 2017 and 2018 USports University Cup. This is the 3rd time UNB has hosted the University Cup - they first hosted a two-year bid in 2003 & 2004 and again in 2011 & 2012. UNB is the first program to host the event 3 times since the expanded format was introduced in 1998.

The Alberta Golden Bears won their 16th title over the St. Francis Xavier X-Men. Alberta last won the University Cup in 2015. St. F.X. was last in the final in 2016 when they lost to UNB Varsity Reds in the finals.

It was announced a month prior to the tournament, that the next two tournaments would be 'singles', first hosted by Lethbridge Pronghorns (2019/UCup57 - ENMAX Centre) followed by Acadia Axemen (2020/UCup58 - Scotiabank Centre). The tournament format would remain unchanged for both years.

Road to the Cup

AUS playoffs

OUA playoffs

Note 1: UQTR forfeit their first 13 games due to an ineligible player, resulting in the loss of eight(8) wins. Their record of 15-6-1, at the time of the January announcement, was correct to 7-14-1. They finished with a record of 8-19-1 (17pts for 10th).

Note 2: The Queen's Cup championship game must be held in Ontario (part of the arrangement when the RSEQ hockey league merged with the OUA). When a Quebec-based OUA-East representative is the higher seed and should 'host' the game - the game shall be hosted by the OUA-West team instead, but the OUA-East team shall be the 'home' team and have last change.

Canada West playoffs

University Cup tournament
The eight teams to advance to the tournament are listed below. The three(3) conference champions must be seeded 1-3 based on the pre-tournament Top 10 Rankings followed by the OUA Runner-up (seed #4). The remaining four seeds are for the AUS Finalist, Canada West Finalist, OUA Third-place and host. Their seedings are based on the pre-tournament rankings.

Since UNB advancing as the AUS Champion, Acadia - as the AUS 3rd-place finisher (AUS Bronze), would take the place of the 'host'. To avoid a first round all-conference matchup between UNB and Acadia, Acadia #8 and Concordia #7 swapped seeds.

Tournament format
The tournament is a traditional 8 team, single elimination ladder with bronze medal game between the two semi-final losers. Games that are tied after regulation play a 10-minute overtime period following the 3rd period. If there is no score after the first overtime, the ice is cleaned and they would play 20 minute periods (with ice cleaned between periods) until there is a winner.

The higher seed is the 'Home' team for each game (the home team must wear their 'white' jerseys and will get the last change during stoppages of play).

Tournament All-Stars
Stephan Legault, from the Alberta Golden Bears, was selected as the Major W.J. 'Danny' McLeod Award for U Sports University Cup MVP. Stephan had 2 goals and 5 assist for 7 points in 3 games.

Joining Legault on the tournament all-star team were:
Forward: Mark Simpson (UNB Varsity Reds)
Forward: Michael Clarke (St. Francis Xavier X-Men)
Defenseman: Jagger Dirk (St. Francis Xavier X-Men)
Defenseman: Kendall McFaull (Saskatchewan Huskies)
Goalie: Zach Sawchenko (Alberta Golden Bears)

See also
2018 U Sports Women's Ice Hockey Championship

References

External links
 Tournament Website

U Sports ice hockey
Ice hockey competitions in New Brunswick
University Cup, 2017
Sport in Fredericton
2018 in New Brunswick